Tiana Jaber (born 9 May 2000) is an Australian soccer player who plays as a defender Australian club Western United in the A-League Women. She has previously played for Western Sydney Wanderers and Newcastle Jets.

Early life
Jaber spent her childhood growing up in Western Sydney whilst attending Glenwood High School; she is of Lebanese descent.

Club career

Western Sydney Wanderers 
Jaber played for North West Sydney Koalas in the National Premier Leagues NSW Women's before being signed on a scholarship contract by the Western Sydney Wanderers in 2019. On 14 February 2020 Jaber was upgraded to a professional contract as she began training more frequently with the first team. She made her debut for the club on 20 February as a second-half substitute in a 4–0 loss to Melbourne City.

The February debut would prove to be Jaber's sole appearance for the Wanderers as she left the club at the conclusion of the 2019–20 season to play for Sydney University in the NSW Women's NPL.
The 2020 season was successful for Jaber and Sydney University as the side won the Premiership and narrowly lost the Grand Final 2–1 to Manly United.

Newcastle Jets 
After her exciting season with Sydney University Jaber returned to the W-League and signed with the Newcastle Jets ahead of the 2020–21 season. Jaber played four matches in her first season with the Jets as she contended with Tessa Tamplin for the starting full-back position.

Jaber spent the winter of 2021 at National Premier Leagues ACT Women's side Western Canberra Wanderers where she become known for her competitive nature collecting multiple yellow cards throughout the season.

Jaber returned to Newcastle for the 2021–22 season where a revitalised Jets side sought to return to the A-League Women finals series. The departure of Tamplin overseas also presented Jaber with an opportunity to feature in the starting eleven. The young full-back started the opening match of the season against Sydney FC, however she was sent off in the 77th minute as the Jets lost 3–1. Jaber returned from suspension on Matchday 3 against her former club Western Sydney, she opened the scoring with a long range effort in the 1–1 draw with the Wanderers. Jaber's first professional goal impressed many viewers across the league.

Western United 
In February 2023, Jaber joined expansion club Western United as an injury replacement player until the end of the 2022–23 A-League Women season, following an anterior cruciate ligament injury to Aimee Medwin.

Career statistics

References

2000 births
Living people
Australian people of Lebanese descent
Sportspeople of Lebanese descent
Soccer players from Sydney
Australian women's soccer players
Women's association football defenders
Western Sydney Wanderers FC (A-League Women) players
Newcastle Jets FC (A-League Women) players
Bankstown City FC players
Western United FC (A-League Women) players
A-League Women players